The men's 2590 metres steeplechase was a track and field athletics event held as part of the Athletics at the 1904 Summer Olympics programme. It was the only time the event was held at the 2590 metre distance, though the 1900 Summer Olympics had featured a similar event in the 2500 metre steeplechase. The competition was held on August 29, 1904. 7 athletes from 2 nations competed. Jim Lightbody of the United States won the first of his three gold and four overall medals in the 1904 Games. Irishman John Daly took silver, with Lightbody's countryman Arthur L. Newton earning bronze.

Background

Steeplechase events had been introduced to the Olympics in 1900, with two distances at the Paris Games (2500 metres and 4000 metres). At St. Louis 1904, there was only one steeplechase at 2590 metres. The distance would continue to change with a 3200 metres event at London 1908, before the event was removed entirely in 1912. After World War I, steeplechase returned with the now-standard 3000 metres distance at the 1920 Games; it has been held at that distance ever since.

Irish runner John Daly was the favorite. American Jim Lightbody was a distance runner who had never competed in a steeplechase before.

Competition format

The race distance was 2590 metres, with hurdles and a water jump. Only a final was held.

The track was a cinder track 1/3 mile in length with one long straightaway.

Records

These were the standing world and Olympic records (in minutes) prior to the 1904 Summer Olympics.

(*) The distance of this race was 2500 metres and the track was 500 metres in circumference.

Schedule

Results

References

Sources
 

Athletics at the 1904 Summer Olympics
Steeplechase at the Olympics